Mouvaux is a commune in the Nord department in northern France. It is part of the Métropole Européenne de Lille.

Population

Heraldry

Twin towns – sister cities

Mouvaux is twinned with:
 Buckingham, England, United Kingdom
 Halle, Belgium
 Neukirchen-Vluyn, Germany

See also
Communes of the Nord department

References

Communes of Nord (French department)
French Flanders